Anthony Michael McGrane (1 June 1946 – 15 September 2004) was an Australian politician.

McGrane was born in Forbes. He had a lengthy career in local government, as a long serving councillor in Gilgandra and Dubbo.

McGrane was elected in March 1999 as an independent, defeating the National Party candidate, Richard Mutton by 14 votes to represent the seat of Dubbo in the New South Wales Legislative Assembly. Dubbo had been the safest National Party seat in New South Wales. He was re-elected in March 2003 with a significantly increased majority against the National Party's Mark Horton.

After a short battle with liver cancer, McGrane died in Sydney in 2004.

He was succeeded in Parliament by independent Dubbo councillor Dawn Fardell.

References

 

Members of the New South Wales Legislative Assembly
1946 births
2004 deaths
20th-century Australian politicians
21st-century Australian politicians